WRHT (96.3 FM), also known as "Talk 96.3", is a radio station, broadcasting with 100,000 watts that cover the Greenville/New Bern/Jacksonville area with a talk format. WRHT is licensed to Morehead City. WRHT is owned and operated by Inner Banks Media, owned by Henry Hinton.

History
WRHT started in the 1970s as WMBL-FM on 95.9 FM. For a time the station used to simulcast on WMBL AM 740 with a MOR/Standards format. In 1981 WMBL-FM changed their calls to WMBJ as "J-96" and later 'Sunny 95.9'. In the mid 1980s, WMBJ moved to 96.3 and became "Sunny 96.3". In the late 1980s 96.3 changed calls to WRHT and became a CHR music station as '96.3 The Hot FM'.

Simulcast
In the early 2000s WRHT/WCBZ were known as "Hot 96 and 103-7".

In 2003, Archway Broadcasting Group, LLC, announced its acquisition of WRHT, WCBZ, and two other Greenville market stations--WNBR and WZBR—from Eastern North Carolina Broadcasting Company, Inc. for $6.5 million. Also that year, Archway bought WGPM and WCZI.

In January 2004, WCBZ changed callsign to WRHD. That same year while under ownership of Archway Broadcasting, the station's studios moved to New Bern.

In September 2005, both stations became "The HOT FM" again as part of their 15th Anniversary.

Inner Banks Media LLC bought WRHT and WRHD as part of a cluster of stations from Archway for $4.5 million in March 2007.

On April 25, 2007, HOT FM moved to the weaker frequencies of WWHA-FM 94.1 (formerly WNBR) in Oriental and WWNK-FM 94.3 (formerly WGPM) in Farmville. Both were the home of country "94 HANK-FM". The Country format moved to the stronger 96.3/103.7 frequencies and became now known as "Thunder Country".

On March 15, 2010, Thunder Country and WTIB-FM traded frequencies.

On May 3, 2010, WRHD split from the "Thunder Country" simulcast and changed their format to adult contemporary, branded as "Star 94.3".

On November 5, 2018, WRHT changed their format from country (which moved to WNBU 94.1 FM Oriental) to talk, branded as "New Talk 96.3".

On-air
Current on-air personalities include: Raeford Brown, Clark Willis, and Rush Limbaugh

Past Personalities include Grizz Lee, Miles Brooks, Charlie, Jenny Cruz, Chase, Dylan McKay, Chris Brooks, Mad Dawg, Jazz, Heather Davis, Cody,

References

External links
Talk 96.3 official website

RHT
Talk radio stations in the United States